The Reverend Doctor Virgil A. (Buck) Moyer, Jr. (October 28, 1920 – June 1, 2015) was a Lutheran pastor who served as President and Bishop of the Virginia Synod from 1976–1987.

Virgil A. Moyer, Jr. was born on October 28, 1920 to Virgil Albert Sr. and Ruth McCune Moyer. Moyer was ordained in 1945, with a Bachelor of Divinity from Southern Seminary, and earned a Doctor of Divinity from Roanoke College in 1977.  He married Jaqueline Mildred Jones in 1945, and served a variety of congregations in Virginia.  Moyer was instrumental in planning for the synod's merger into the Evangelical Lutheran Church in America on January 1, 1988.  He supported creation of the Metropolitan Washington Synod and the alignment of the synod into Region 9 of the ELCA.  In 1971 he led the development of Caroline Furnace Camp while serving as Assistant to the President of the Synod (1959-1968).  He also served as regional mission consultant for the Lutheran Church in America's Division for Mission in North America (1973-1976). He was named President Emeritus of the Virginia Synod upon his retirement in 1987.

References

20th-century Lutheran bishops
Evangelical Lutheran Church in America bishops
1920 births
2015 deaths
20th-century American clergy